Glenea bellona is a species of beetle in the family Cerambycidae. It was described by James Thomson in 1879. It is known from Malaysia, Java, and Sumatra.

Subspecies
 Glenea bellona albomaculata (Gahan, 1889)
 Glenea bellona bellona Thomson, 1879
 Glenea bellona hebe Thomson, 1865

References

bellona
Beetles described in 1879